Marija Radosavljević (born 18 July 1927) is a retired Yugoslav shot putter who represented SFR Yugoslavia at the 1948 Summer Olympics and 1952 Summer Olympics. She finished 7th at both Olympics. She was born in Valjevo.

References

1927 births
Living people
Yugoslav female shot putters
Athletes (track and field) at the 1948 Summer Olympics
Athletes (track and field) at the 1952 Summer Olympics
Olympic athletes of Yugoslavia
Sportspeople from Valjevo